John Merriam may refer to:

John Campbell Merriam (1869–1945), American paleontologist
John L. Merriam (1825–1895), Minnesota banker and politician